Georges Petit (born 1900, date of death unknown) was a Belgian racing cyclist. He rode in the 1927 Tour de France.

References

1900 births
Year of death missing
Belgian male cyclists
Place of birth missing